Hercus is a genus of ichneumonid wasp in the subfamily Tryphoninae. There are about seven described species in Hercus.

Species
These seven species belong to the genus Hercus:
 Hercus coracinus Gupta, 1984 c g
 Hercus fontinalis (Holmgren, 1857) c g b
 Hercus nepalensis Gupta, 1984 c g
 Hercus peruensis Gupta, 1984 c g
 Hercus rectus Gupta, 1984 c g
 Hercus rufithorax Gupta, 1984 c g
 Hercus tibialis Kasparyan, 1994 c g
Data sources: i = ITIS, c = Catalogue of Life, g = GBIF, b = Bugguide.net

References

Further reading

External links

 

Parasitic wasps